Jane Dee Hull (August 8, 1935 – April 16, 2020) was an American politician and educator. In 1997, she ascended to the office of governor of Arizona following the resignation of Fife Symington, becoming the state's 20th governor. Hull was elected in her own right the following year, and served until 2003. Hull was the first woman formally elected as Governor of Arizona, and the second woman to serve in the office after Rose Mofford. She was a member of the Republican Party.

A native of Kansas City, Missouri, Hull was a graduate of the University of Kansas with a degree in education. Hull worked as an elementary school teacher while her husband studied to become an obstetrician. She moved to Arizona with her husband, Terry, in 1962 where he began working on the Navajo Nation, while Jane raised the couple's four children and taught English. In 1964, the family moved to Phoenix, where she continued to raise her family. A decade later, she started her political career, and became involved with Republican women groups, in addition to volunteering on political campaigns.

In 1978, Hull was elected to her first political office, as a member of the Arizona House of Representatives. During her tenure in office, she would become House Majority Whip and Speaker of the House. In 1994, she was elected to the office of Secretary of State of Arizona, becoming the first Republican to hold the office in more than six decades. After ascending to the office of Governor of Arizona following Fife Symington's resignation, Hull was elected Governor in 1998 over former Mayor of Phoenix Paul Johnson, in a landslide election. Hull was constitutionally barred from running for a second full term in 2002, and retired from public service.

Early life and career
Hull was born Jane Dee Bowersock in Kansas City, Missouri, the daughter of Mildred (Swenson) and Justin Bowersock, an editor of The Kansas City Star newspaper. Hull graduated from the University of Kansas with a degree in education. She taught elementary school in Kansas while her husband was a public health physician there. She moved to Arizona in 1962, first to the Navajo Nation, and later to Phoenix.

After hearing a Barry Goldwater speech, she campaigned for him in the United States presidential election in 1964.

Legislative career
Hull entered politics in 1978, being elected to the Arizona House of Representatives as a Republican. She served for seven terms, including two as speaker of the House, the first female speaker in Arizona history. In 1991, while she was speaker, the Arizona legislature experienced a major political scandal called AZSCAM, which resulted in the resignation or removal of ten members of the House and Senate. As a result, Speaker Hull instituted a number of ethics reforms to reestablish public confidence in the legislature.

Politically, On The Issues, a non-profit and non-partisan organization which records politicians' stances on issues, considers Hull to have been a centrist or moderate Republican. Her record is considered to be fiscally conservative and socially moderate.

Governor of Arizona

First term (1997–1999)

Hull was elected Arizona Secretary of State in 1994. After Governor Fife Symington was forced to resign due to a felony conviction, Hull became governor on September 5, 1997. She was sworn in by U.S. Supreme Court Justice Sandra Day O'Connor, herself a former Arizona legislator. Arizona has no lieutenant governor, so the secretary of state, if holding office by election, stands first in the line of succession.

1998 gubernatorial campaign
Hull was elected governor in her own right in 1998. This election was particularly significant because it was the first time in the history of the United States that all five of the top elected executive offices in one state were held by women: Hull; Betsey Bayless, secretary of state; Janet Napolitano, attorney general; Carol Springer, treasurer; and Lisa Graham Keegan, Superintendent of Public Instruction.

Second term (1999–2003)
While she was governor, Hull's relations with home state U.S. Senator John McCain were strained. During the 2000 Presidential primary season she endorsed his opponent, Texas Governor George W. Bush, in the Arizona primary.

Hull is known for having signed into law the bill that resulted in the "alt-fuels" scandal of 2000. The resulting law promised car buyers up to 60 percent off new vehicles if they were converted to run on alternative fuels like propane or natural gas, yet it did not properly cap the number of buyers eligible for the program nor did it require buyers to use the new fuels. Instead of the $10 million the program was supposed to cost, it ended up costing Arizona $200 million before lawmakers changed the rules.

Post-governorship
Hull was constitutionally barred from running for a second full term in 2002 (the Arizona constitution limits the Governor to two consecutive terms, or parts of terms, even when he or she ascends to the office in the middle of a term), and she was succeeded by Janet Napolitano, who defeated Matt Salmon. After leaving office, she spent three months in New York City, as a public delegate from the United States to the United Nations General Assembly (2004).

After the death of Rose Mofford on September 15, 2016, Hull became the oldest living Governor of Arizona, in addition to being the oldest living Secretary of State of Arizona. An elementary school is named for Hull in Chandler.

Personal life
Hull married Terry Hull, an obstetrician in 1954. They had four children. Hull died on April 16, 2020 at age 84; her husband had died earlier on the same day.

Electoral history

Legacy
Hull, at the end of her term in 2002, said “I just hope people remember me as a straight shooter.”

See also

 List of female governors in the United States
 List of female secretaries of state in the United States
 List of female speakers of legislatures in the United States

References

External links
 Biography of Jane Dee Hull from the United States Mission to the United Nations
 Governor Jane Dee Hull (Jeff Scott's biography)
 Alt-Fuels Fiasco (Synopsis by Arizona Republic)
 

|-

|-

|-

|-

|-

1935 births
2020 deaths
20th-century American politicians
20th-century American women politicians
21st-century American politicians
21st-century American women politicians
Republican Party members of the Arizona House of Representatives
Arizona State University alumni
Republican Party governors of Arizona
People from Chinle, Arizona
Politicians from Kansas City, Missouri
Politicians from Phoenix, Arizona
Secretaries of State of Arizona
Speakers of the Arizona House of Representatives
University of Kansas alumni
Women legislative speakers
Women state governors of the United States
Women state legislators in Arizona
Women state constitutional officers of Arizona